Pseudopegolettia thodei is a species of plant in the family Asteraceae. It is native to South Africa.

References 

Asteraceae
Flora of South Africa